The weightlifting competition at the 2018 Central American and Caribbean Games was held in Barranquilla, Colombia from 20 to 24 July at the Coliseo Universidad del Atlántico.

Participating nations
A total of 111 athletes from 14 nations competed in weightlifting at the 2018 Central American and Caribbean Games:

Medal summary

Men's events

Women's events

Medal table

References

External links
2018 Central American and Caribbean Games – Weightlifting 

2018 Central American and Caribbean Games events
Central American and Caribbean Games
2018
2018 Central American and Caribbean Games